Amblyseius phillipsi is a species of mite in the family Phytoseiidae.

References

phillipsi
Articles created by Qbugbot
Animals described in 1984